Barkaa (born 1995 as Chloe Quayle), styled BARKAA, is an Australian  rapper and musician, and is a Malyangapa and Barkindji woman.

In September 2020, GQ Magazine dubbed her "the new matriarch of Australian rap". and in 2020, Triple J listed her as one of the top 5 female rappers in Australia.

Early life
Barkaa was born as Chloe Quayle in 1995. Her mother was one of the Stolen Generations, and she had an uncle who died in police custody. She lived  in the western Sydney suburb of Merrylands as a child. She was known for performing rap at high school, and entered rap competitions in Blacktown. She is a Malyangapa and Barkindji woman.

Career
Barkaa takes her name from the Barkindji word for the Darling River, and says that she feels very honoured to have been given permission to use this name to represent her people. Her music reflects her experiences with incarceration, child removal and addiction, with much of it overtly political; she has drawn from the words of Shareena Clanton and Rosalie Kunoth-Monks in her songs.

She first performed in front of an audience in 2019, at a Klub Koori event.

She released her debut single, "For My Tittas", in March 2020. Her song "Our Lives Matter", released in June 2020, became the unofficial anthem for the Black Lives Matter movement in Australia. She has collaborated with DOBBY ("I Can't Breathe") and Electric Fields, and has performed at the Sydney Opera House, Enmore Theatre in Sydney and the Sidney Myer Music Bowl in Melbourne.

Her debut album was Blak Matriarchy, so named "in honour of powerful First Nations women who've paved the way for future generations", including her mother. The song "King Brown", which she says is about a "shitty ex" is on the album.

Barkaa performed at the Paartjima festival on the 2022 Easter weekend in Alice Springs.

As of November 2021 Barkaa is signed to Bad Apples Music, founded by Briggs.

Personal life
Barkaa was addicted to methamphetamine as a teenager, and spent three periods in juvenile detention or  prison, where she gave birth to her third child, a son, in around 2016. She has been free of drugs since then, and has her children back. Her daughter Alinta often performs with her.

Discography

Extended plays

Singles

Notes

Awards and nominations

ARIA Music Awards
The ARIA Music Awards is an annual awards ceremony that recognises excellence, innovation, and achievement across all genres of Australian music. They commenced in 1987. 

! 
|-
| rowspan="2"| 2022
| Blak Matriarchy
| Best Hip Hop / Rap Release
| 
| rowspan="2"| 
|-
| "Blak Matriarchy" (Barkaa, Selina Miles)
| Best Video 
| 
|-

National Indigenous Music Awards
The National Indigenous Music Awards is an annual awards ceremony that recognises the achievements of Indigenous Australians in music.

! 
|-
! scope="row" rowspan="4"| 2022
| Barkaa
| New Talent of the Year
| 
| rowspan="4"| 
|-
| "King Brown"
| Song of the Year
| 
|-
| "King Brown"
| Film Clip of the Year
| 
|-
| "Blak Matriarchy"
| Film Clip of the Year
| 
|}

References

External links

1995 births

Living people
20th-century Australian musicians
Australian women rappers
Bad Apples Music artists
Rappers from Sydney